Limnohabitans planktonicus is a Gram-negative,  oxidase- and catalase-positive, aerobic, unpigmented bacterium from the genus Limnohabitans, which was isolated from the mesoeutrophic freshwater reservoir in Římov in the Czech Republic.

References

External links
Type strain of Limnohabitans planktonicus at BacDive -  the Bacterial Diversity Metadatabase

Comamonadaceae